United States Navy Armed Guard units were established during World War II and headquartered in New Orleans.  The purpose of the guard was to man the deck guns of merchant ships to provide a nominal defense against attack. This was to counter the constant danger presented by enemy submarines, surface raiders, fighter aircraft and bombers.   There was a shortage of escort vessels to provide the merchant vessels with adequate protection.  The NAG had three training centers, at Norfolk, Virginia; San Diego, California; and Gulfport, Mississippi.  At the end of the war, there were 144,857 men serving in the Navy Armed Guard on 6,200 ships.

Unit composition 

The United States Navy Armed Guard (USNAG) were U.S. Navy gun crews consisting of Gunner's Mates, Coxswains and Boatswains, Radiomen, Signalmen, an occasional Pharmacist's Mate, and toward the end of the war a few radarmen serving at sea on merchant ships.  Armed Guard crews served on Allied merchant marine ships in every theatre of the war.  Typically the crew was led by a single commissioned officer, but earlier in the war chiefs and even petty officers had command.

Duty 

The assignment as an Armed Guardsman was often dreaded because of the constant danger. Merchant ships were slow, unwieldy, and priority targets of submarines and planes. Furthermore, merchant ships were among the last to receive updated equipment.  Early on in the war, some ships only had a few machine guns, so the crews painted telephone poles to imitate the barrels of larger guns.  The most common armament mounted on merchant ships were the MK II 20mm Oerlikon autocannon and the 3"/50, 4"/50, and 5"/38 deck guns.

When practicable, the Navy Armed Guard aboard a merchant ship would provide cross-training to merchant crew members in the use of the guns in the event the Navy personnel were killed or injured.  The Navy Armed Guardsmen would typically sail round trip on the same ship, occasionally they would get a different assignment upon reaching their destination depending on convoy schedules.

In film 
The 1943 film Action in the North Atlantic, featuring Humphrey Bogart, Raymond Massey, and Alan Hale, illustrates the importance of the Naval Armed Guard and how it interfaced with the Merchant Marine officers and crew.

See also 

 Action off Cape Bougaroun
 Battle of Point Judith
 Battle of the Atlantic
 Destroyer escort
 Kenneth Martin Willett
 Defensively equipped merchant ship
 
 Convoy PQ 17
 Deck gun
 Liberty ship
 Victory ship

References

The Battle of the North Atlantic 1939-1943, by Samuel Eliot Morison, 
 A Measureless Peril, America in the fight for the Atlantic..., by Richard Snow,

External links 
 US Navy Armed Guard Veterans/Memorial Web Site
 Arming of Merchant Ships and Naval Armed Guard Service (US Naval Administration in World War II, Vol. 172)
 History of the Naval Armed Guard Afloat, World War II (US Naval Administration in World War II, Vol. 173)

United States Navy organization
United States Navy in World War II